Former American stock car racing driver Jeff Gordon has become an iconic figure in popular culture. While Gordon became a household name among NASCAR fans for his driving career in the Cup Series, he has introduced the sport to a wider audience, largely through the media of the United States.

Topics

Art

Throughout his NASCAR Cup Series career, Gordon had a partnership with artist Sam Bass. They met in 1992, when DuPont chose a rainbow design Bass created to become Gordon's primary paint scheme. Bass designed several paint schemes for Gordon, including fantasy designs used on die-cast. Bass also worked on the designs of the No. 24 team's racing suits and haulers. Bass' first painting of Gordon, Rookie Sensation!, was made in 1993.

Gordon has been featured in several paintings by Garry Hill, notably Brickyard Thunder, based on Gordon's victory in the 1994 Brickyard 400. Gordon is included in some of Hill's All-Star Race painting series, which Hill began in 1987. Hill has also designed cover art for race programs. Gordon is listed as a collector of Hill's work on the artist's website.

Gordon's colorful No. 24 DuPont Chevrolet Monte Carlo is featured in several paintings by Marc Lacourciere.

Gordon is the subject of a 1998 painting by LeRoy Neiman.

From 1999 to 2012, designer Aaron Decarlo worked with Gordon on special paint schemes and program cars.

In 2007, Daytona International Speedway officials hired a local sand sculptor to create a NASCAR-themed depiction of Mount Rushmore in the fanzone, featuring the faces of Dale Earnhardt Jr.; Gordon; Jimmie Johnson; and Tony Stewart. In 2008, NASCAR Illustrated recruited Brooklyn-based artist Jim Cooke to create a Hendrick Motorsports-themed illustration of Mount Rushmore for the magazine's October issue. The cover art features the faces of HMS' 2009 driver lineup: Gordon; Johnson; Earnhardt Jr.; and Mark Martin.

Bill Patterson, who has been live painting races at Phoenix Raceway since 2006, created two pieces based on Gordon's 2007 victory at the track: his late race pass on Tony Stewart and his victory lap tribute to Dale Earnhardt.

Tuscaloosa, Alabama-based artist Rick Rush created a painting titled Finishing Strong (2008), which was presented to the United States Sports Academy's American Sport Art Museum & Archives in 2017. The piece features the vehicles of Johnson; Gordon; and Earnhardt Jr.

A floral version of Gordon's rainbow No. 24 car–along with Richard Petty's blue No. 43 and Dale Earnhardt's black No. 3–will be featured in a NASCAR-themed float at the 134th Rose Parade on January 2, 2023 in Pasadena, California. Titled "Always Forward", and described as a nod to its parade's theme–"Turning the Corner", the display will be used to celebrate NASCAR's 75th anniversary and promote the 2nd running of the Busch Light Clash at The Coliseum on February 5, 2023.

Filmography
Gordon has made cameo appearances as both himself and fictional characters in films and television series.

Film
When asked about plans to star in a film in 2001, Gordon responded "Heck no." He was reportedly attached to Race Jam, a cancelled film which would have been a NASCAR-themed spin-off to Space Jam. Gordon ultimately signed with Warner Bros. and made his feature film debut through a cameo appearance in Looney Tunes: Back in Action (2003). He shot his Back in Action scene in Las Vegas a day after his victory at Kansas Speedway in 2002. His #24 Dupont Chevrolet Monte Carlo also makes an appearance in the film where it gets stolen by Yosemite Sam, Nasty Canasta, and Cottontail Smith in an attempt to chase down Damian Drake, Kate Houghton, Bugs Bunny, and Daffy Duck who have recently won a playing card. Gordon made an uncredited cameo appearance in Taxi (2004), in which his girlfriend at the time  Ingrid Vandebosch played a bank robber, while he appears in the end of the film, shown challenging the protagonist Belle Williams to a race.

Gordon was interested in a role for the film Talladega Nights (2006), but declined an offer to participate due to concerns from his sponsors. However, Gordon invited actor Will Ferrell, who plays Ricky Bobby in the film, to accept his 11th-place reward at the 2005 Nextel Cup Series banquet at Waldorf Astoria New York, as Gordon was in Paris to compete in that year's Race of Champions.

Gordon voices the Cars character Jeff Gorvette in Cars 2 (2011) and Cars 3 (2017). Based on the Chevrolet Corvette C6.R, Gorvette is a primarily yellow racing car with the stars and stripes of the American flag painted on his sides. Like his voice actor, Gorvette uses the No. 24 in competition. Pixar has called Gordon a major inspiration for Cars 3. Gordon and his former crew chief Ray Evernham also served as story consultants for Cars 3.

Television
As a child racer, Gordon was featured in segments on Kids Are People Too and PM Magazine, and was the subject of an episode for a series titled Super Kids. Gordon was featured on ESPN's SpeedWeek in 1985, making his first appearance on the network at age thirteen. He subsequently became a media sensation through the network's Thursday Night Thunder program, using his appearances in Thunder races to establish a national following.

Home video

Music videos

Web

Advertising
Gordon has appeared in advertising through various forms of media, including print; television; and online. His image has been featured on beverage cans and bottles, billboards, cereal boxes, corn chip bags, toothpaste tubes, and vending machines. He has been called one of NASCAR's most marketable drivers.

Beginning with the 1997 season, Gordon represented PepsiCo as a spokesperson. He has appeared in television spots for Fritos. In 2011, Gordon worked with Pepsi Max to create the Road Trip to the Race Track video as a promotion prior to the Coke Zero 400.

Gordon appeared in an ad for the Got Milk? campaign in 1997, sporting the milk mustache. The photo shoot took place in New York with portrait photographer Annie Leibovitz. Gordon was the first racing driver to be featured in the campaign.

He has also appeared in ads for DuPont, Chevrolet, Coca-Cola, DieHard, Nutmeg Mills, Papa John's Pizza, Quaker State, Edy's, Ray-Ban, Foster Grant, TNT, Nextel, Sprint, USTA, Elizabeth Arden's Halston Z-14, Tylenol, Siegfried & Roy Present Darren Romeo: The Voice of Magic, Famous Dave's, AARP, Team Umizoomi, NAPA, Fox Sports, and Fox Sports 1.

Cultural references

Execution of Joseph Mitchell Parsons

On October 15, 1999, Joseph Mitchell Parsons was executed in Utah for the murder of Richard Lynn Ernest. Prior to his death by lethal injection, Parsons' final words were: "Love to my family and friends. And Woody, the rainbow warrior rules. Thank you."

According to eight of Parsons' fellow death row inmates, the "rainbow warrior" comment was a reference to the nickname given to the entire No. 24 pit crew, whose car carried a rainbow paint scheme at the time. Parsons' closest inmate, Doug "Woody" Lovell, revealed that the two bet their candy bars on NASCAR races; Parsons always bet on Gordon. Parsons also reportedly had a picture of Gordon in his cell.

Homages
 While addressing the Gridiron Club Dinner in 2003, Senator John Edwards of North Carolina, then a potential candidate for the 2004 Democratic Party presidential primaries, joked that his "dream Cabinet" would include Gordon as the Secretary of Transportation.

 Former President Bill Clinton mentioned Gordon via Twitter in 2015, calling him "a great friend to me and to the Clinton Foundation." Clinton wrote the tweet in honor of Gordon's final scheduled NASCAR start.

Media

Comedy and music
 Comedian and country artist Tim Wilson wrote and recorded NASCAR-themed parody songs, most notably "Dale Darrell Waltrip Richard Petty Rusty Awesome Bill Irvin Gordon Earnhardt Smith...Johnson Jr." (also known as "The NASCAR Song"), originally featured on the album Tuned Up (1997) and later on the greatest hits album Certified Aluminum: His Greatest Recycled Hits, Vol. 1 (2002). Another parody is "The Jeff Gordon Song" (also known as "Jeff Gordon's Gay"), which debuted on The Bob & Tom Show and later saw a release on Certified Aluminum.
 Comedian Jeff Foxworthy jokes about Gordon's elocution in his stand-up routine "Jeff Gordon Enunciates", featured on the album Big Funny (2000).
 Hip hop artist Nelly raps "I drive fastly, call me Jeff Gord-on, in the black SS with the naviga-tion" in the song "E.I.", featured on the album Country Grammar (2000).
 Hip hop artist Jay-Z raps "It's Hov tradition, Jeff Gordon of rap / I'm back to claim pole position, holla at ya boy" in his feature on the Kanye West song "Never Let Me Down", featured on West's debut album The College Dropout (2004).
 Country music parodist Cledus T. Judd sings "Just watchin' Jeff Gordon plow up a wall, puts a smile on Dale Jr.'s face" in the song "I Love NASCAR", featured on the album Bipolar and Proud (2004).
 Hip hop artist Kanye West raps "Do the dishes, I'm about to hit that Jeff Gordon" in his "Power" remix (2010).
 Hip hop artist Kevin McCall raps "Haters better stay in they lane, I'm Jeff Gordon" in his feature on the Chris Brown song "Fuck Um All", featured on Brown's mixtape In My Zone 2 (2010).
 Hip hop artist Mayne Mannish of The Team raps "I'm Jeff Gordon in his heyday, Ridin' like Tony Stewart smashing through a two-way" in The Team's feature on the Clyde Carson song "Slow Down", featured on Carson's mixtape S.T.S.A. (Something To Speak About) (2012).
 Hip hop artist Shaboozey raps about being "Young Jeff Gordon" in the song "Jeff Gordon" (2014).
 Hip hop artist Young Sizzle has a song titled "Jeff Gordon" (2016).
 Hip hop artist Lil Yachty raps "Call me Jeff Gordon" in his feature on the Yung Bans song "Jeff Gordon" (2016). There is a version exclusively with Lil Yachty's vocals titled "Nascar" (2016).

Film and television
 In the Aqua Teen Hunger Force episode "Kidney Car" (2003), Carl Brutananadilewski says to Meatwad, "Ease off the pedal there, Jeff Gordon."
 In the Danny Phantom episode "What You Want" (2004), during the flying car scene, Danny Phantom yells at the driver, "Hey, slow down, Jeff Gordon!".
 In the film Couples Retreat (2009), Jason Smith (portrayed by Jason Bateman) tells Dave (portrayed by Vince Vaughn), "If Jeff Gordon told you that your oil was low, you might want to think about changing it."

Fictional portrayals
 The King of the Hill episode "Life in the Fast Lane, Bobby's Saga" (1998) portrays Gordon less than favorably, as he screams "Daddy!" in a nasal tone when his car spins out and hits the wall, alluding to earlier comments about how the main cast do not care for him because his father pulled strings to get him the car.
 The Celebrity Deathmatch episode "Sex, Lugs and Rock 'n' Roll" (2000) pits Gordon and Dale Earnhardt against each other in a "demolition derby to the death." Show creator Eric Fogel revealed in a May 2011 IAmA that the Earnhardt–Gordon match was among his favorites.
 The South Park episode "Poor and Stupid" (2010) lampoons Gordon, along with fellow drivers Dale Earnhardt Jr.; Jimmie Johnson; Danica Patrick; Tony Stewart; and Matt Kenseth. Commenting on the episode, Gordon believed that while the episode was making fun of NASCAR, it managed to bring the sport good publicity.
 In a March 2015 Tank McNamara comic strip written and illustrated by cartoonist Bill Hinds, Gordon is portrayed as a private driver for the title character.
 In a live episode of The Adventure Zone, a podcast created by Griffin, Justin, and Travis McElroy, Jeff Gordon appears pulling a decommissioned sleigh formerly owned by Santa Claus with his teeth. He is shown to be able to fly, have superhuman strength, and eat light and turn it into power. Later in the episode, he becomes the new Santa after the other characters murder the previous Santa Claus, at which point he is renamed "Seff Cordon." As Santa, he gives all the children of earth signed copies of The Bible.

Magazines

Gordon has appeared on the cover of several magazines, including: NASCAR Illustrated, TV Guide,  Sports Illustrated, ESPN The Magazine, Inland Empire Magazine, Sporting News, Racing Milestones, Bluff, WebMD the Magazine, Pain Pathways, and Autoweek.

Video games

Gordon is the feature driver of the video game Jeff Gordon XS Racing, and is a guide for gamers to progress through the game, and also is an opponent in a later duel in the game. Gordon has appeared on the covers of the EA Sports NASCAR series games NASCAR 98 and NASCAR Thunder 2002, while Gordon and Hendrick Motorsports teammate Jimmie Johnson are on the cover of NASCAR 06: Total Team Control, highlighting Team Control, the main addition of the game; he also appears on the cover of NASCAR 09, in which he serves as a mentor for players in the "Sprint for the Cup" mode. On May 15, 2015, he was announced as the cover driver of Eutechnyx's NASCAR '15. Gordon is the cover driver for Monster Games' NASCAR Heat 4 Gold Edition and appears exclusively in the gold edition as a playable driver and spotter.

Gordon appeared in Gran Turismo 5 as himself, providing tutorials on racing in NASCAR, which had been newly added to the series.

References

Notes

Citations

Sources

External links
 Jeff Gordon at Creative Artists Agency
 
 Jeff Gordon on Saturday Night Live
 
 

Celebrities in popular culture
Cultural depictions of American men
Cultural depictions of racing drivers
Popular culture